Thomas Gilmer may refer to:

 Thomas Walker Gilmer (1802–1844), American statesman
 Thomas Lewis Gilmer (1849–1931), American oral surgeon